Owen Township is one of fourteen townships in Clinton County, Indiana. As of the 2010 census, its population was 930 and it contained 334 housing units.  The township was named for Robert Dale Owen of New Harmony.

History
Originally included in Jackson Township, Owen was organized as a separate township in March, 1843.  It lost a one-mile (1.6 km) strip along its southern border to Union Township which was created in 1889, leaving Owen a five-mile (8 km) by five mile square.  The first settlers in the area were Elihu Short, Samuel Gray, John Temple and John Miller in 1828.

Geography

Unincorporated towns
 Cambria
 Ellis
 Geetingsville
 Moran
 Sedalia
(This list is based on USGS data and may include former settlements.)

Adjacent townships
 Democrat Township, Carroll County (north)
 Burlington Township, Carroll County (northeast)
 Warren Township (east)
 Michigan Township (southeast)
 Union Township (south)
 Ross Township (west)

Major highways
  Indiana State Road 26
  Indiana State Road 75 
Indiana State Road 38

Cemeteries
Cemeteries:

 Mount Hope
 Old Chaney
 ...and more

References
 United States Census Bureau cartographic boundary files
 U.S. Board on Geographic Names

Townships in Clinton County, Indiana
Townships in Indiana
Populated places established in 1843
1843 establishments in Indiana